The 1990 Tennents' Sixes was the seventh staging of the indoor 6-a-side football tournament. For the fifth time it was held at the Scottish Exhibition and Conference Centre (SECC) in Glasgow on 28 and 29 January with a first prize of £16,000.

All clubs in the 1989-90 Premier Division season competed and the two group winners and runners-up qualified to the semi-finals. Both semi-final ties were decided on penalties and Hibernian beat St Mirren 2–0 in the final to win their first Sixes title.

Group 1

Group 2

Semi-finals

Final

References

External links
Scottish Football Historical Archive
Tournament programme

1989–90 in Scottish football
1990s in Glasgow
January 1990 sports events in the United Kingdom
Tennents' Sixes
Football in Glasgow
Sports competitions in Glasgow